Trichoncus is a genus of sheet weavers that was first described by Eugène Louis Simon in 1884.

Species
 it contains twenty-eight species.
Trichoncus affinis Kulczyński, 1894 – Europe
Trichoncus ambrosii Wunderlich, 2011 – Switzerland, Italy
Trichoncus aurantiipes Simon, 1884 – Portugal, Morocco, Algeria, Tunisia
Trichoncus auritus (L. Koch, 1869) – Europe
Trichoncus gibbulus Denis, 1944 – France
Trichoncus hackmani Millidge, 1955 – Central, Northern Europe
Trichoncus helveticus Denis, 1965 – Switzerland, France
Trichoncus hirtus Denis, 1965 – France (Corsica)
Trichoncus hispidosus Tanasevitch, 1990 – Russia
Trichoncus hyperboreus Eskov, 1992 – Russia
Trichoncus kenyensis Thaler, 1974 – Kenya
Trichoncus lanatus Tanasevitch, 1987 – Georgia
Trichoncus maculatus Fei, Gao & Zhu, 1997 – China
Trichoncus monticola Denis, 1965 – Spain
Trichoncus nairobi Russell-Smith & Jocqué, 1986 – Kenya
Trichoncus orientalis Eskov, 1992 – Russia
Trichoncus patrizii Caporiacco, 1953 – Italy
Trichoncus pinguis Simon, 1926 – Spain
Trichoncus rostralis Tanasevitch, 2013 – Israel
Trichoncus saxicola (O. Pickard-Cambridge, 1861) – Europe
Trichoncus scrofa Simon, 1884 (type) – France, Spain (Majorca), Italy to Hungary
Trichoncus similipes Denis, 1965 – Portugal
Trichoncus sordidus Simon, 1884 – Europe
Trichoncus steppensis Eskov, 1995 – Kazakhstan
Trichoncus trifidus Denis, 1965 – Portugal, Spain
Trichoncus uncinatus Denis, 1965 – Algeria
Trichoncus vasconicus Denis, 1944 – Europe, Russia to Kazakhstan
Trichoncus villius Tanasevitch & Piterkina, 2007 – Russia (Europe), Kazakhstan

See also
 List of Linyphiidae species (Q–Z)

References

Araneomorphae genera
Linyphiidae
Spiders of Africa
Spiders of Asia